Dahira svetsinjaevae is a moth of the family Sphingidae that is endemic to China.

References

External links

svetsinjaevae
Moths described in 2006
Endemic fauna of China